Sainte-Jeanne-d'Arc is a church located in the French city of Besançon, in the departement of Doubs.

History 
Construction of the church began in 1930, in the area of Bregille. The choir was completed in 1933 but work on the rest of the building was terminated, not to resume until 1948. M. Dumas drew up a new plan of the steeple (31 meters high), and the building took on a Gothic Revival architecture style. In 2002, the church was renovated and in 2006, rooms were made available for the use of Orthodox Christians.

References

See also 
 Besançon
 Besançon Cathedral

Joan of Arc
Buildings and structures in Besançon
Churches in Doubs
Roman Catholic churches in Besançon